Pt. Ravishankar Shukla University is an institution of higher education located in Raipur, Chhattisgarh, India. It is one of the largest and oldest institutions of higher education in Chhattisgarh. It is a state university founded in 1964 by the Government of Madhya Pradesh. It is a teaching-cum-affiliating university  which affiliates about 144 colleges and has 29 University Teaching Departments.

History

Pt. Ravishankar Shukla University, Raipur, was established in 1964. It is named after Pt. Ravishankar Shukla, the first chief minister of Madhya Pradesh. The university came into being on May 1 and was functional from June 1, 1964 with 46 affiliated colleges, five university teaching departments (UTDs) and 34,000 students. Indira Gandhi, the then minister of Information & Broadcasting, inaugurated the university postgraduate department in five subjects on July 2, 1965.

The university has grown enormously over the last 44 years in terms of number of students (approx. 1.2 lakh) as well as disciplines, viz., humanities, natural science, law, education, pharmacy, management, physical education, library science, computer science, etc. in 23 schools and 144 affiliated colleges spread over 5 districts of Chhattisgarh.

Chhattisgarh was carved out as a political entity on November 1, 2000 by the state of Madhya Pradesh.

Campus
The university has a sprawling campus in the western part of the capital of Raipur city. The campus has the following facilities:
Library Building
Computer Centre
Administrative Block
Health Centre
Bioscience Block
Vice Chancellor's & Registrar's Lodge
Geology Building
Law Building
Electronic Building
Cellular & Molecular Biology Building
Science Block
Boy's & Girl's Hostel
Auditorium
Teacher's Hostel
Play Ground
Guest House
Stadium
Gymnasium
Employment Bureau

Affiliated colleges
Its jurisdiction extends over 5 districts -Baloda bazar, Dhamtari, Gariaband, mahasamund, Raipur .

Departments
School of Studies in Adult, Continuing Education & Extension  
School of Studies in Ancient Indian History, Culture & Archaeology  
School of Studies in Anthropology 
School of Studies in Physics and Astrophysics
School of Studies in Bio-Technology
Center for Basic Sciences  
Center for Regional Studies and Research  
Center for Woman Studies  
School of Studies in Chemistry  
School of Studies in Comparative Religion and Philosophy 
School of Studies in Computer Science & IT 
School of Studies in Economics  
School of Studies in Electronics 
Institute of Teachers Education 
School of Studies in Geography  
School of Studies in Geology and Water Resource Management 
School of Studies in Statistics 
School of Studies in History  
Institute of Management  
University Institute of Pharmacy 
Institute of Tourism and Hotel Management  
School of Studies in Law  
School of Studies in Library and Information Science  
School of Studies in Life Sciences 
School of Studies in linguistic 
School of Studies in Literature and Languages 
School of Studies in Molecular Biology
School of Studies in Mathematics
School of Studies in Zoology
 School of Studies in Psychology

Hostels
Azad Hostel
Gandhi Hostel
Powergrid Hostel
Research Hostel
Girls Professional Hostel 
Girls Hostel 
Girls Research Hostel 
Naveen Kanya Hostel
Girls SC/ST Hostel

Rankings

Pandit Ravishankar Shukla University was ranked in the 101–150 band among universities in India by National Institutional Ranking Framework (NIRF) in 2020 and 59 in the pharmacy ranking.

References

External links

 
Universities in Chhattisgarh
1964 establishments in India
Educational institutions established in 1964